David Ariu Christopher, also known as Kariamakin Airu Christopher (died 26 February 2022) was a politician of Banaban descent, who has held office in two countries — Fiji and Kiribati.

Christopher was educated at Niusawa Primary School, Queen Victoria School, Lelean Memorial School and then the University of the South Pacific. He worked for the Fiji Sugar Corporation, and then for Rabi Holdings, the investment company of the Rabi Council of Leaders. He was appointed to the Kiribati House of Assembly in 1994, serving a term of four years as representative of the Banaban people living on Rabi Island in Fiji.

At the 2001 Fijian general election1 he won the North Eastern General electorate for the Soqosoqo Duavata ni Lewenivanua (SDL) of Laisenia Qarase, becoming the first Banaban elected to the House of Representatives of Fiji.  He lost his seat to Robin Irwin at the 2006 election. Christopher's former constituency was one of three reserved for "General Electors" - Fijian citizens who are not of ethnic Fijian, Indian, or Rotuman descent. Following the 2006 Fijian coup d'état and the dissolution of the SDL he returned to work for the Rabi Council as executive director.

In 2016 Christopher was again appointed to fill the nominated seat for Rabi Island in the Kiribati House of Assembly. He was renominated at the 2020 Kiribati parliamentary election.

References

Year of birth missing
1940s births
2022 deaths
Members of the House of Assembly (Kiribati)
Members of the House of Representatives (Fiji)
Fijian people of i-Kiribati descent
Soqosoqo Duavata ni Lewenivanua politicians
Ethnic minority members of the House of Representatives (Fiji)
Politicians from Rabi Island
University of the South Pacific alumni
Banaba